Paphiopedilum acmodontum is a species of plant in the family Orchidaceae. It is endemic to the Philippines.

References 

acmodontum
Plants described in 1976
Endemic orchids of the Philippines